Iván Luis Leszczuk (born 20 February 1996) is an Argentine professional footballer who plays as a midfielder for San Martín.

Club career
Leszczuk featured for the Boca Juniors academy from the age of six, a club he became a professional with in 2016. A year later, in 2017, Leszczuk signed with Lanús; having had off-field disagreements with Boca Juniors. On 29 May 2018, Leszczuk was loaned to Primera B Nacional's Los Andes; effective from 1 July, until 31 December. He made his senior bow during a home defeat to Independiente Rivadavia on 25 August 2018. He returned to Lanús after eight matches. Leszczuk resigned for Los Andes permanently in February 2019. However, he departed midway through the year to Fénix. He left in August 2020.

Leszczuk became a new signing of Primera C Metropolitana side San Martín in February 2021.

International career
Leszczuk, who is of Polish descent, represented Argentina at U17 and U20 level. He won fourteen caps in 2013 for the U17s at both the South American Championship and FIFA World Cup, with his nation winning the first on home soil prior to finishing fourth at the World Cup in the United Arab Emirates; he scored two goals in the former against Colombia and Paraguay respectively. Two years later, Leszczuk won one cap at the 2015 South American U-20 Championship as he won his second international honour.

Career statistics
.

Honours
Argentina U17s
South American U-17 Championship: 2013

Argentina U20s
South American Youth Football Championship: 2015

References

External links

1996 births
Living people
People from Lomas de Zamora
Argentine people of Polish descent
Argentine footballers
Argentina youth international footballers
Argentina under-20 international footballers
Association football midfielders
Primera Nacional players
Primera B Metropolitana players
Boca Juniors footballers
Club Atlético Lanús footballers
Club Atlético Los Andes footballers
Club Atlético Fénix players
San Martín de Burzaco footballers
Sportspeople from Buenos Aires Province